Hans Hoffmann (c. 1530 in Nuremberg – 1591/92 in Prague) was a German painter and draftsman. A leading representative of the Dürer Renaissance, he specialised in watercolor and gouache nature studies, many of them copied from or based on Dürer's work.

Biography
By 1576 he was living in Nuremberg, where he was mentioned in the records of the town-council meetings as the painter Hans Hoffmann, citizen of the town. He quickly became known for his copies after works by Albrecht Dürer. 
 
In 1584 he went to Munich to work on behalf of William V, Duke of Bavaria. In 1585 he was appointed as a court painter by Rudolf II, Holy Roman Emperor, who brought him to the imperial court in Prague. At the imperial court, Hoffmann advised Rudolph on the development of his art collection and acquired for him works by Dürer.

The art collection assembled by the Nuremberg citizen  contained more than 100 works by Hans Hoffmann. Because the collection was intact until the beginning of the 19th century, many of these works are documented.

References

Further reading 
 Bodnár, Szilvia. "Hoffmann, Hans." In Grove Art Online. Oxford Art Online,  (accessed February 1, 2012; subscription may be required or content may be available in libraries)
 
 Koreny, Fritz. Albrecht Dürer and the Animal and Plant Studies of the Renaissance. Pamela Marwood and Yehuda Shapiro, trans. (Boston: Little, Brown and Company, 1988). .

External links 
 
 Entry for Hans Hoffmann on the Union List of Artist Names

16th-century German painters
German male painters
German draughtsmen
Renaissance painters
Artists from Nuremberg
1530s births
1590s deaths